Qimen County (alternately romanized as Keemun) is a county in the southeast of Anhui Province, People's Republic of China, bordering Jiangxi Province to the southwest. It is the westernmost county-level division of the prefecture-level city of Huangshan City. The government of Qimen County is located in Qishan Town.

Qimen County has jurisdiction over seven towns and thirteen townships.

History
Qimen County was established in 766 during the Tang Dynasty (Yongtai Era 2). It takes its name from the Mount Qi in the northeast and the Chang River in the southwest.

The headquarters of the Xiang Army were in Qimen during part of the Taiping Rebellion.

Administrative divisions
Qimen County is divided to 8 towns and 10 townships.
Towns

Townships

Climate

Economy

Qimen County is a tea-producing region, and the black tea called Keemun tea is named after Qimen.

Transportation

Rail
Qimen is served by the Anhui–Jiangxi Railway.

Places of interest 
The area around the border with Shitai County contains a National Nature Reserve. It includes a  peak in the Huangshan Mountains.

See also
Likou, a town in Qimen County

References

External links
Qimen County official site 

County-level divisions of Anhui
Huangshan City